Dinokanaga is a small genus of scorpionfly belonging to the extinct family Dinopanorpidae.  The six species D. andersoni, D. dowsonae, D. hillsi, D. sternbergi, D. webbi, and D. wilsoni have all been recovered from Eocene fossil sites in British Columbia, Canada, and Washington state, United States.

Dinokanaga is a combination of the Greek word deino meaning "terrible" or "monstrous" and okanaga in reference to the Eocene Okanagan Highlands fossil sites where the specimens have been recovered.  The type description of the genus was first published in 2005 by Dr. Bruce Archibald in the Canadian Journal of Earth Sciences.  Description of the new genus was based on the study of over 20 compression fossil specimens from five fossil producing locations in the highlands.  Dinokanaga and Dinopanorpa, currently the only known genera in the family Dinopanorpidae, are distinguished by a number of wing vein characters including lack of fine reticulated crossveins in Dinopanorpa, and the "Rs" vein branched 3-5 times in Dinokanaga.  The fossil specimens of high preservation quality sometimes show the original color patterning, being mostly dark with light to clear areas.  Within the genus wing characters are key to separating the species.

Description

Dinokanaga hillsi
Dinokanaga hillsi, the type species, is identified by its subtriangular shaped wing which is widest at the middle, color pattern of three distinct dots, and an apical wing margin which is smoothly curved. D. hillsi along with D. dowsonae are the only two species in which part of the insects body is known, rather than just isolated wings.  Though known from a number of specimens D. hillsi has only been found at the McAbee Fossil Beds near Cache Creek, British Columbia, and is named for Dr. Len Hills.

Dinokanaga dowsonae

D. dowsonae is identified by the penniform shape of the wings, and by the size which is larger than similar shaped wings in the other species.  D. dowsonae  is he most wide spread of the species, occurring at three different fossil sites in the Okanagan Highlands while the five other species are restricted to a single site each.  This species is named in honor of Shelley Dowson, collector of one of the specimen paratypes.

Dinokanaga andersoni
D. andersoni is known from only the holotype specimen, collected and housed at the Stonerose Interpretive Center in Republic, Washington.  The species is notably narrower in the preserved areas of the holotype wing then other species.  The species was named in honor of Eric Anderson who first collected the type specimen in 2001.

Dinokanaga sternbergi
The species is distinguished by the short length of the "Sc" vein and small size, D. webbi being the only species smaller in wing size.

Dinokanaga wilsoni
Only a single poorly preserved D. wilsoni hindwing has been found, but the shape is distinct enough to separate it from the other Dinokanaga species, being broadly a rounded oval. The sole specimen was found the Whipsaw Creek locality of the Allenby Formation near Princeton, British Columbia, and named for Dr. Mark Wilson of the University of Alberta.

Dinokanaga webbi
The type specimen was found in "Horsefly shale" outcrops along the Horsefly River near Horsefly, British Columbia, and the species named in honor of Robin Webb of British Columbia.

References

Mecoptera
Fossil taxa described in 2005
Insects described in 2005
Fossils of British Columbia
Ypresian insects
Prehistoric insects of North America
Allenby Formation
Horsefly Shales
Klondike Mountain Formation
Tranquille Formation